Yulia Sergeyevna Mavrina (September 10, 1984) is a Russian theater, television and film actress. She is known for the role Lilia Subbotina in the TV series Mothers and Daughters (2007).

Biography 
Yulia Mavrina was born in Feodosiya into the family of a serviceman. Her mother is Larisa Mavrina, a physics teacher.

Mavrina's passion for the theater has its roots in her early childhood. In the early 1990s, she, together with a partner of the studio, made of Dramatic Art in Moscow, in the TV program Morning Star. In 1997 she moved with her mother to St. Petersburg. In 1999, she entered the academy aged 14, after leaving school (completed later externally), she entered the Faculty of Dramatic Arts of the Saint Petersburg State Theatre Arts Academy (course G. Barysheva). Extremely gifted musically, she was considered a prima ballerina on her course. She played a major role in the graduation performance Mademoiselle Nitouche.

In 2002 she made her debut in the movie as Olga in Igor Maslennikov's Letters to Elsa, but first success came to Mavrina after that New Year's Eve aired the musical Cinderella, where she played a major role. Directed by Simon Gorov long chose the main character of an impressive number of contenders, but opted for an unknown student from St. Petersburg.

She is married to Russian actor Nikita Zverev (Никита Вячеславович Зверев), whom she met in Kyiv while filming. She has a daughter from a previous relationship, Alisa Zvereva (born 2005). Her mother entered her in music school at the age of 4, and aged 5 she had a role in a children's operetta. Her mother is a physicist and her father is a programmer.

Filmography
2002 Letters to Elsa as Olga
2002 Cinderella as Cinderella
2003 Poor, Poor Pavel as Anna Lopuchina
2005 Destructive Power 6 (TV series) as Nikole 
2006 Short Breath as Irina Motorina
2006 Game Shindal as Maria
2006 City without the sun as Liusi 
2007 Mothers and Daughters (TV series) as Liliya Subbotina
2007 Labyrinth of Love (TV) as Svetlana Litvinova
2008 Two Fates. New life as Ariana
2008 Daughter as Masha Balashova
2009 Flying as Matilda
2009 Beauty Territory (TV series) as Ekaterina
2011 On the Sunny Side of the Street as Vera
2012 Love between Two Poles (TV) as Veronika
2013 Life After Life (TV) as Masha
2013 Photos of the Documents (TV) as Anya

References

External links 
 
 Official website of Yulia Mavrina

1984 births
Living people
People from Feodosia
Russian film actresses
Russian television actresses
Russian stage actresses
21st-century Russian actresses
Russian State Institute of Performing Arts alumni